Samuel Morris III (born March 23, 1977) is a former American football running back in the National Football League (NFL) for the Buffalo Bills, Miami Dolphins, New England Patriots and Dallas Cowboys. He was drafted by the Buffalo Bills in the fifth round of the 2000 NFL Draft. He played college football at Texas Tech University.

Early years
Morris attended John Jay High School, where he played both quarterback and running back. As a senior, he was named the San Antonio Offensive Player of the Year by the San Antonio Express-News and the District 28-5A MVP.

He accepted a football scholarship from Texas Tech University. As a redshirt freshman in 1996, he appeared in the first eight games of the season, rushing for 226 yards and 4 touchdowns on 29 attempts. The same year, he was placed on academic probation and was forced to take a required academic study course. He was expelled from the school after missing one class and being late for two others. He worked as a short-order cook at Sea World during his time away from football.

In 1997, he missed the season after failing to make the required grades. In 1998, although he earned a 3.0 grade average in the spring semester, he still missed the season  after being ruled ineligible by the NCAA, because his course work did not meet NCAA guidelines.

As a senior in 1999, he appeared in 9 games as a team co-captain. He was second on the squad behind Shaud Williams with 562 rushing yards and 3 rushing touchdowns.

Professional career

Buffalo Bills
Morris was selected by the Buffalo Bills in the fifth-round (156th overall) of the 2000 NFL Draft. As a rookie, he appeared in 12 games with 8 starts, rushing for 341 yards and 5 touchdowns, caught 37 passes for 268 yards and one score, while also making 11 special teams tackles.

In 2001, he appeared in 16 games (one start), leading the team with 28 special teams tackles, while rushing for 72 yards on 20 carries as a backup running back. In 2002, he led the team with 31 special teams tackles. In 2003, he registered 9 special teams tackles in 9 games.

Miami Dolphins
Morris signed a free agent contract with the Miami Dolphins on March 12, 2004, and though he was expected to be a fullback he ended up being the team's leading rusher following the abrupt retirement of Ricky Williams. He started eight of the 13 games he played in, finishing with 523 rushing yards and six touchdowns.

He backed up rookie running back Ronnie Brown in 2005 and led the Dolphins with 16 special teams tackles. Morris was suspended for the first four games of the 2006 regular season.

New England Patriots
On March 3, 2007, the New England Patriots signed Morris to a four-year contract. He started two of the first six games of the season, averaging 4.5 yards a carry. On October 14, 2007 Morris suffered a chest injury while playing against the Dallas Cowboys. On November 2, 2007, after missing two games, Morris was placed on injured reserve with a chest injury, ending his season.

In 2009, he made the USA Today All Joe Team after registering 319 rushing yards with 2 touchdowns along with 19 receptions for 180 yards. He missed 4 games with an injury.
Missed four games due to injury.

Dallas Cowboys
On December 13, 2011, Morris was signed by the Dallas Cowboys after they placed starting running back DeMarco Murray on injured reserve with a fractured ankle and high ankle sprain. He rushed for 98 yards in three games as a backup. He wasn't re-signed after the season.

Coaching career
Morris was an assistant strength and conditioning coach with the Patriots from 2016 to 2018, while simultaneously also being an assistant football coach at Attleboro High School since 2013. In June 2018, he was hired to take over the running back assistant coach position in Dean College.

Morris was named the assistant director of player support development at his alma mater Texas Tech on April 26, 2021.

Personal life
His father Samuel Morris II and his brother Brien Morris, were staff sergeants in the Air Force.

References

External links

 New England Patriots bio

1977 births
American football fullbacks
American sportspeople in doping cases
Buffalo Bills players
Dallas Cowboys players
Dean Bulldogs football coaches
Doping cases in American football
English players of American football
High school football coaches in Massachusetts
Living people
Miami Dolphins players
New England Patriots players
People from San Antonio
Players of American football from Texas
Texas Tech Red Raiders football players
Ed Block Courage Award recipients